The fifth election to the Carmarthenshire County Council was held on 1 May 2012. It was preceded by the 2008 election and was followed by the 2017 election. Plaid Cymru won 28 seats whilst Labour and the Independents won 23 each. The main feature of the election was a Labour recovery in the Llanelli area, and to some extent in the Gwendraeth and Ammanford area also, mainly at the expense of Independent candidates. Plaid Cymru lost ground to Labour in the Llanelli area but gained seats elsewhere, becoming the largest party. An Independent-Labour coalition was again formed, but with Labour as the leading partner. As a result, Kevin Madge replaced Meryl Gravell as the leader of the council.

Madge resigned as leader of the council in May 2015, having lost the leadership of the Labour group. Two days later it was announced that Plaid Cymru would from a coalition with the Independents. Emlyn Dole was elected leader of the council.

Results Overview 
No Overall Control (unchanged)

 

|}

Ward Results

Abergwili (one seat)

Ammanford (one seat)
Deian Harries had come within six votes of victory for Plaid Cymru in 2008. The sitting Labour member, Hugh Evans, a member of the authority since its formation in 1995, stood down and Plaid Cymru captured the seat.

Betws (one seat)
Labour, which had held the seat from 1995 until 2008, came from third place to recapture Betws with a new candidate

Bigyn (two seats)
Labour, having held all seats in Bigyn from 1995 until 2008, regained both on a low turnout. Eryl Morgan was previously county councillor for Hengoed.

Burry Port (two seats)
Pat Jones, a member of the authority since 1999, was re-elected alongside another Labour candidate who narrowly ousted the sitting Independent member, who had served since 2004. The Conservative candidate had stood as a Liberal Democrat in 1999.

Bynea (one seat)
On a very low turnout, Labour came from third place to take a seat held by the Independent candidate, a member of the cabinet, since 2004.

Carmarthen Town North (two seats)
Plaid Cymru again held both seats, for the third successive election.

Carmarthen Town South (two seats)
Plaid Cymru held both seats in this ward for the first time, unseating an Independent member who had served for one term. Jeffrey Thomas had represented Carmarthen North from 2004 until 2008.

Carmarthen Town West (two seats)
Plaid Cymru completed a clean sweep of all seats in Carmarthen Town by ousting Arthur Davies, a leading figure in People First, former Labour councillor and a member of the authority since 1999.

Cenarth (one seat)
Hazel Evans had captured the seat in a by-election following the death of the previous Independent member, Haydn Jones.

Cilycwm (one seat)
Tom Theophilus, who had represented the area for decades narrowly held the seat against one of the most prominent opponents of the previous administration and a leading critic of Mark James, the Chief Executive of the Council.

Cynwyl Elfed (one seat)
Irfon Jones had represented Newchurch from 1995 until 1999 but was defeated by Dorrien Thomas when the enlarged Cynwyl Elfed ward was created following boundary changes. Thomas retired at this election and Jones won a narrow victory over Plaid Cymru.

Cynwyl Gaeo (one seat)
Eirwyn Williams, a member of the authority since 1995, was comfortably re-elected.

Dafen (one seat)
Labour won by a large majority although Plaid Cymru's vote may have been affected by the decision of their former candidate, Clem Thomas, to stand for People First.

Elli (one seat)
One-time Conservative John Paul Jenkins was returned for a third term with a much increased majority in a seat which has traditionally changed hands on a regular basis. The Liberal Democrats who once held the seat failed to field a candidate.

Felinfoel (one seat)
The sitting member, first elected in 2004, held his seat against the former Labour member who was elected in 1995 and 1999.

Garnant (one seat)
Labour's leader on the authority increased his majority.

Glanamman (one seat)
The sitting Plaid member, who gained the seat in 2008, increased his majority.

Glanymor (two seats)
In a ward that returned only Labour councillors from 1995 until 2008, Winston Lemon held his seat for Plaid Cymru and Labour regained the second seat from the Independents. David Tucker, a Labour councillor before 2008 and Keith Skivington, who stood in 2008 for Plaid Cymru, both contested the election as Independents which made the contest more unpredictable.

Glyn (one seat)
Jim Jones, the representative since 1999, won by a large margin.

Gorslas (two seats)
Terry Davies, the member since 2004, held one seat but the second seat was captured by Plaid Cymru, their first success in the ward. Clive Scourfield, the sitting Independent, stood down and there were press reports that Rupert Moon, former Llanelli and wales scrum-half was his chosen successor. Scourfield denied this to be the case and Moon was unsuccessful as the Independent vote was fragmented.

Hendy (one seat)
Labour had gained this seat against the tide in 2008 and the result was now reversed.

Hengoed (two seats)
Sian Caiach, who took a seat for Plaid Cymru, subsequently left the party and joined People First following an internal dispute. Plaid also lost the second seat to Labour in a closely fought contest.

Kidwelly (one seat)
Labour strengthened the hold on a seat won against the tide in 2008.

Laugharne Township (one seat)
Jane Tremlett had held the seat since 2004 and held on by a large majority as there was no Conservative candidate as was the case in 2008.

Llanboidy (one seat)
Roy Llewellyn had been a county councillor since 1989 on the Dyfed and Carmarthenshire authorities. He was unopposed in 2008 but was run close on this occasion by an Independent, as had been the case in 2004.

Llanddarog (one seat)
On a relatively high turnout, Wyn Evans was challenged for the first time for many years.

Llandeilo (one seat)
A close contest followed the retirement of Ieuan Jones, the member since 1999. The Conservative vote was much less than that achieved by Juliana Hughes in 2008.

Llandovery Town (one seat)
Ivor Jackson had been unopposed in 2008 but held the seat comfortably against three opponents.

Llandybie  (two seats)
The two sitting members were returned.

Llanegwad (one seat)
Mansel Charles had stood as an Independent candidate at the previous election but had subsequently won the seat for Plaid Cymru at a by-election following the resignation of Independent councillor Dillwyn Williams.

Llanfihangel Aberbythych (one seat)
The sitting member, Rhys Davies stood down and the seat was won by Cefin Campbell, former director of Welsh language initiative, Mentrau Iaith Myrddin.

Llanfihangel-ar-Arth (one seat)

Llangadog  (one seat)

Llangeler (one seat)

Llangennech (two seats)

Llangunnor (one seat)

Llangyndeyrn (one seat)

Llannon (two seats)

Llansteffan (one seat)

Llanybydder (one seat)
Ieuan Davies comfortably regained the seat he lost in 2008.

Lliedi (two seats)

Llwynhendy (two seats)

Manordeilo and Salem  (one seat)

Pembrey (two seats)

Penygroes (one seat)

Pontamman (one seat)

Pontyberem (one seat)

Quarter Bach  (one seat)

St Clears (one seat)

St Ishmaels (one seat)

Saron (two seats)

Swiss Valley (one seat)

Trelech (one seat)

Trimsaran (one seat)

Tycroes (one seat)

Tyisha (two seats)

Whitland (one seat)

By-Elections 2012-2017

Trelech by-election 2014
A by-election was held in Trelech on 11 December 2014 following the retirement of long-serving Independent councillor Dai Thomas. Plaid Cymru captured the seat for the first time.

Hengoed by-election 2015
A by-election was held in Hengoed on 19 February 2015 following the death of Labour councillor George Edwards. Labour held the seat by a small majority (but note that the percentage changes refer to the contest in the two-member ward in 2012.

Kidwelly by-election 2015
A by-election was held in Kidwelly on 19 November 2015 following the death of Labour councillor Keith Davies.

Cilycwm by-election 2016
A by-election was held in Cilycwm on 22 September 2016 following the death of long-serving Independent councillor Tom Theophilus. 
Plaid Cymru captured the seat for the first time.

References

2012
2012 Welsh local elections
21st century in Carmarthenshire